The Lurgrotte karst cave is the largest cave in the Eastern Alps of Styria, Austria. The cave has two accessible entrances, one at the village of Semriach and the other at the village of Peggau. At the Semriach entrance, the Lur River sinks into the cave. At the Peggau entrance, the Schmelz River emerges from within the cave, flowing to the west and eventually joining the Mur River.

History 
Archaeologists have found material in and around the cave that indicates habitation since the Paleolithic era. One specimen, a reindeer bone with tool markings, has been radiocarbon dated to approximately 52,000 years ago.

The cave was first scientifically explored by the Italian cave explorer Max Brunello on April 1, 1894. While the higher portions of the cave were known to locals, Brunello was the first to discover the lower portion of the cave. The next attempt to explore further provoked disaster.

On April 29, 1894, seven cavers entered the Lurgrotte, despite heavy rainfall. A flash flood occurred while they were inside, and they wound up trapped for ten days. Emperor Franz Joseph I approved a rescue effort, employing large numbers of workers, miners, and divers who bailed out the water and successfully rescued the trapped cavers.

In February 1905, members of the Austrian Tourist Club surveyed  of passages within the Lurgrotte.

In the 1920s, the cave explorer Hermann Mayer worked with his father to develop the Peggauer section of the Lurgrotte for visitors. In addition, they tried to find a link between the Peggauer entry and Semriach entry. On November 26, 1924, the route was cleared by explosives, but it was not until 1935 that the first crossing was possible.

Pezzi planned to turn the Lurgrotte into a show cave and construct railway through the cave.

In the following years the Lurgrotte was developed into a show cave, with infrastructure such as bridges, walkways, and lights added for visitors. From 1962 it was possible for visitors to wander through the entire cave, until 1975, when parts of the infrastructure were washed away in a powerful storm. Because the flooding recurs on a yearly basis, the full infrastructure has never been repaired.

Hydrology 

The Lurgrotte is a complex, three-level cave which forms a drainage system for the entire Tanneben karst area. Because of its complexity, and the difficulty in exploring the cave's numerous underground channels, the cave's hydrology is poorly understood. It is known that the Lur River enters at the Semriach entry, and the Schmelz River exits from the Peggau side. When rainfall is heavy, excess water from the Lur system can overflow into the Schmelz system, so it is confirmed that there is a high-water connection between the two, although its location and extent are still unknown.

Attempts to trace the outflow using dye have shown that the water from the Lur emerges in springs south of the cave, while the flow of the Schmelz appears to originate from sources north of the Lurgrotte.

Tourism 
Since the flooding of 1975, it is no longer possible to cross through the caves from one side to another. Visitors can instead tour through a shortened area at each end of the cave.

References

Further reading 
 Benischke, Ralf: Lurgrotte's commemorative publication 1894-1994 - on the occasion of the centenary of the cessation of cave explorers by floods and their salvation. National association for cave studies in Styria, Graz 1994.  -  OBV .
 Pollack, Vincenz: Technical work at the Lurloch near Semriach in Styria . In: Journal of the Oesterreichische Ingenieur- und Architektenverein . (ZÖIAV). Volume 46.1894, Issue 20, ZDB-ID 2534647-7 , p. 289 f. - Full text online (PDF, 12.8 MB) .
 Putick, Wilhelm: The Lurloch in the Streiflichte der Technik . In: Journal of the Oesterreichische Ingenieur- und Architektenverein . (ZÖIAV). Vol. 46.1894, vol. 36, ZDB-ID 2534647-7 , p. 437-441, as well as panel XV. - Full text online (PDF, 9,2 MB) .
 The seven cave explorers in Lurloch and their salvation from the danger of death. Fritz, Vienna, 1894, OBV .
 Setz, Wilhelm: The rescue work in the Lurlochhöhle near Semriach - along with a tarp . In the self-publishing house, Graz 1902, OBV .
 Staindl, Rudolph: Revelations of the Lurloch affair (etc.) . Bileg, Vienna, 1909, OBV .
 Saar, Rudolf: The Lurhöhle - near Peggau in Styria (formerly Schmelzgrotte) . Austrian cave guide, volume 3, ZDB-ID 677015-0 (old). Austrian State Printing Company, Vienna 1922, OBV
 Zweyer, Karl: Lurloche buried alive for nine days. Experiences of a cave explorer. With a preliminary report on the work undertaken to rescue the cave explorer included in the Lurloche near Semriach. Hans Wagner, Graz, 1894. - OBV 
 Kusch, Heinrich and Ingrid: Caves of Styria - fantastic worlds. Steirian publishing company, Graz 1998,  .

External links 

 Lurgrotte - Semriacher entrance website
 Lurgrotte - Peggauer entrance website

Show caves in Austria
Caves of Austria
Limestone caves
Landforms of Styria
Tourist attractions in Styria
Graz Highlands